Deadline is a 1948 American Western film directed by Oliver Drake and starring Sunset Carson, Al Terry and Pat Starling.

Cast
 Sunset Carson as Sunset Carson
 Al Terry as Tom Taylor
 Pat Starling as Martha Taylor
 Pat Gleason as Spade Gilbert
 Lee Roberts as Henchman Trigger
 Stephen Keyes as Grant Dawson
 Frank Ellis as Henry Blake
 Forrest Matthews as Henchman Pete Hawkins
 Bob Curtis as Joe, Doc's assistant 
 Phil Arnold as Doc Snodgrass
 Joe Hiser as Shorty
 Don Gray as Don
 Buck Monroe as Henchman Bill
 Al Wyatt Sr. as Henchman Dale

References

Bibliography
 Pitts, Michael R. Western Movies: A Guide to 5,105 Feature Films. McFarland, 2012.

External links
 

1948 films
1948 Western (genre) films
American Western (genre) films
Films directed by Oliver Drake
Astor Pictures films
1940s English-language films
1940s American films